Sneakin' Out is the fourth studio album by American singer Stacy Lattisaw. Released on July 22, 1982, by Cotillion Records, Lattisaw was 15 years old at the time of this release. The single, "Don't Throw it All Away", peaked at number nine on the U.S. R&B chart in 1982.

Track listing
"Sneakin' Out" – 5:50   	
"Guys Like You (Give Love a Bad Name)" –	4:03 	
"Memories" – 4:08 	
"Tonight I'm Gonna Make You Mine" – 3:04 	
"Hey There Lonely Boy" – 3:54 	
"Don't Throw It All Away" – 4:04 	
"Attack of the Name Game" – 6:25 	
"I'm Down for You" – 5:10 	
"I Could Love You So Divine" – 4:16

Personnel
Stacy Lattisaw – lead and backing Vocals
Narada Michael Walden – drums, keyboards, percussion, piano
Randy Jackson – bass
Frank Martin – keyboards, synthesizer
Corrado Rustici, "Joe-Bob" Castelle Blanch – guitar
Sheila Escovedo – percussion
Michael Gibbs – tenor saxophone
Gary Herbig – alto saxophone
Marc Russo – trumpet
Jim Gilstrap, John Lehman, Cathy Miller, Kelly Kool, Myrna Mathews, Roy Galloway – backing vocals

Legacy
This album is noted for featuring future American Idol judge Randy Jackson on bass.  Also the song "Attack of the Name Game" would later be sampled by Mariah Carey as part of her 1999 number-one pop hit "Heartbreaker."

Charts

Singles

References

External links
 Stacy Lattisaw-Sneakin' Out at Discogs

1982 albums
Stacy Lattisaw albums
Albums produced by Narada Michael Walden
Cotillion Records albums